Ida Facula is a bright mountain on Amalthea, one of Jupiter's smallest moons.  It is known to be about 15 kilometers in width, somewhat smaller than the neighboring mountain Lyctos Facula. It was discovered by Voyager 1 in 1979 and in the same year named for Mount Ida, a mountain in Crete where Zeus played as a child. Firstly it was called simply Ida.

References 

Amalthea (moon)
Extraterrestrial mountains
Surface features of Jupiter's moons